Ghubb is a suburb of the city of Ras Al Khaimah, United Arab Emirates (UAE).

Populated places in the Emirate of Ras Al Khaimah